Oroqen or variants may refer to:
Oroqen people, an ethnic group in northern China
Oroqen language, a Northern Tungusic language spoken in China
Oroqen Autonomous Banner, subdivision of Inner Mongolia, China

Language and nationality disambiguation pages